SacAnime is a semi-annual three day anime convention held at the SAFE Credit Union Convention Center in Sacramento, California. The convention is the sister conventions to the Sacramento Comic, Toy and Anime Show (Sac-Con) and Bak-Anime.

Programming
SacAnime typically features an animated music video contest, art contests, artists alley, card-game tournaments, console gaming, cosplay chess, costume contests, dealers room, fashion show, karaoke, maid cafe, masquerade, music performances, panels, Q&A sessions, rave, swap meet, video games, and workshops.

History
SacAnime began as an extension of the quarterly Sacramento Comic, Toy and Anime Show (Sac-Con). The convention was originally known as the Sacramento Anime & Manga Show and became a semi-annual event in 2005. Due to the summer conventions growth, it moved to the Sacramento Convention Center in 2013. The Winter 2013 show was also moved to the Sacramento Convention Center. The Summer 2013 event shared the Sacramento Convention Center with the Sacramento Greek Festival, and with the convention badge attendees could enter festival for free. The convention expanded into additional space in the Sacramento Convention Center, along with holding some events in the Sheraton Grand Sacramento Hotel. The Winter 2014 convention continued to utilize space in the Sheraton Grand. A marriage proposal occurred during the costume contest. Sac-Anime Winter 2016 was the first year they used all exhibit halls at the Sacramento Convention Center. Prop guns were banned at the Summer 2017 convention. SacAnime Summer in 2019 will be moving from September to June.

SacAnime in 2020 moved to Cal Expo due to renovations occurring at the Sacramento Convention Center. SacAnime Summer 2020 was cancelled due to the COVID-19 pandemic. SacAnime Winter 2021 was cancelled due to the COVID-19 pandemic and the Sacramento Convention Center not being available. The convention returned to the SAFE Credit Union Convention Center in September 2021, after the venue received $180 million in renovations. They also had a mask mandate. The January 2022 event had COVID-19 protocols and on-site testing.

Event history

Bak-Anime

Bak-Anime is an annual one- or two-day anime convention held at the Bakersfield Marriott at the Convention Center in Bakersfield, California by the staff of Sac-Anime. The convention began due to the requests of fans from the Bakersfield Comic Con.

SacAnime Gives Back! 
SacAnime Gives Back! was a one-day charity anime convention held at the McClellan Conference Center in McClellan Park, California.

Event history

SacAnime Swap Meet 
SacAnime Swap Meets were events held at the Placer Valley Event Center in Roseville, California. September's Swap Meet was also known as the Roseville Comic-Con. The January 2021 event was postponed due to the COVID-19 pandemic. The April 2021 event occurred under controversial circumstances. Placer County's COVID-19 vaccination center at the Swap Meet's venue closed for the event. The vaccination center traditionally didn't operate over weekends and SacAnime offered to adjust it's needed space, which ended up not being necessary. SacAnime had mask and social distancing rules during the event, which was branded as a swap meet with only vendors. Issues during the event included a lack of social distancing, poor mask enforcement, and no hand sanitizing dispensers in the event space.

Event history

References

External links
 Sac-Anime official website
 SacAnime Gives Back! official website
 Bak-Anime official website
 Sacramento Comic, Toy and Anime Show (Sac-Con) official website

Anime conventions in the United States
Recurring events established in 2004
2004 establishments in California
Annual events in California
Conventions in California
Tourist attractions in Sacramento County, California
Culture of Sacramento, California
Tourist attractions in Sacramento, California
Semiannual events